Henry Theak (19 March 1909 – 14 September 1979) was an Australian cricketer. He played twenty-three first-class matches for New South Wales between 1929/30 and 1934/35.

See also
 List of New South Wales representative cricketers

References

External links
 

1909 births
1979 deaths
Australian cricketers
New South Wales cricketers
Cricketers from Sydney